The Greece women's national under-16 basketball team is a national basketball team of Greece, administered by the Hellenic Basketball Federation. It represents the country in women's international under-16 basketball competitions.

FIBA U16 Women's European Championship participations

See also
Greece women's national basketball team
Greece women's national under-18 basketball team
Greece men's national under-17 basketball team

References

External links
Archived records of Greece team participations

Basketball in Greece
Basketball
Women's national under-16 basketball teams